The R-13  was a submarine-launched ballistic missile (SLBM) developed by the Soviet Union starting around 1955.  It was assigned the NATO reporting name SS-N-4 Sark and carried the GRAU index 4K50.

History
Development of the R-13 was authorised by the Soviet Supreme Council on 25 July 1955 for use on the Project 629 and Project 658 submarines. The design work was started by OKB-1 under Sergei Korolev before being transferred to CB Miasskoe engineering / Makeyev Rocket Design Bureau (chief designer - Viktor Makeyev). Final technical specifications was approved by 11 January 1956. Serial production was undertaken at Zlatoust Machine-Building Plant in 1959.  The R-13 was a single-stage liquid-fuel rocket and entered service in 1961.  This missile was somewhat similar in design to the R-11FM missile, which caused some confusion in Western intelligence services during the Cold War.  The missiles were phased out from 1965 to 1975.

This missile was the first Soviet design to use a small set of rocket engines  (vernier thrusters) to perform course and trajectory alterations instead of aerodynamic control surfaces, although a set of four stabilizers were used to keep the missile on-course during initial flight.

During initial testing before the missiles were deployed, 26 of 32 missiles (81%) were successfully launched.  While the systems were deployed from 1961 to 1975, 225 of 311 launches (72%) were successful.

Operators

Soviet Navy

Specifications
Length: 11.8 m (38 ft 9 in)
Diameter: 1.3 m (4 ft 3 in)
Diameter (to stabilizers): 1.9 m (6 ft 3 in)
Launch weight: 13.7 t
Warhead: single thermonuclear: 1.2 to 2.0 Mt (perhaps as low as 1.0 Mt)
Propulsion: liquid-fuel rocket, single stage
Oxidizer: AK-271
Fuel: TG-02
Range: about 
Launching technique: surfaced
CEP: 1.8 to 4 km (1.1 to 2.5 miles)

See also 
 List of missiles

References

FAS.org: R-13 / SS-N-4 Sark
Ракетный комплекс Д-2 С БРПЛ Р-13(35-М-4)  In Russian - inc diagrams

R-013
Cold War missiles of the Soviet Union
Makeyev Rocket Design Bureau
Military equipment introduced in the 1960s